Thomas Morley (1513–1559), of Glynde, Sussex, was an English politician.

He was a Member of Parliament (MP) for Arundel in March 1553.

References

1513 births
1559 deaths
English MPs 1553 (Edward VI)
People from Glynde